The page lists various individuals who have won multiple Southeast Asian Games medals, including the preceding Southeast Asian Peninsular Games.

As of 2019, Singaporean swimmer Joscelin Yeo has won the most Southeast Asian Games medals with 55 (40 gold, 12 silver, 3 bronze). She managed this feat during the 2005 Games, where her last medal overtook the previous record holder of 39 gold medals by another Singaporean swimmer, Patricia Chan.

List of most Southeast Asian Games medals over career
This is a list of multiple Southeast Asian Games medalists, listing people who have won five or more Southeast Asian Games medals. The Years listed for each athlete only include the Games in which they won medals. More detailed information is provided in the linked articles for the individual athletes.

In those instances where more than one athlete has the same number of total medals, the first tiebreaker is the number of gold medals, then the number of silver medals. Where two or more athletes have exactly the same number of gold, silver and bronze medals, the ranking is shown as a tie and the athletes are shown in order by career years and name.

References

Asian games